State Highway 95 (SH 95) is a 14.33 mile (23.06 km) long north–south state highway in the U.S. state of Colorado. SH 95's southern terminus is at U.S. Route 285 (US 285) in Denver and the northern terminus is at US 36 in Westminster.

Route description

The route, also known as Sheridan Boulevard, starts at US 285 in Denver and ends at US 36 in Westminster. There are interchanges with US 6, I-70, and I-76. In the area between I-70 and Colfax Avenue, the road lies just west of Sloan's Lake. State Highway 95 is generally considered to be the dividing line between Jefferson County on the west and Denver and Adams counties on the east.

Major intersections

References

External links

095
Transportation in Jefferson County, Colorado
Transportation in Denver
Transportation in Adams County, Colorado
Arvada, Colorado
Transportation in Lakewood, Colorado
Westminster, Colorado